The Agas-Agas Bridge is a prestressed concrete beam bridge on the Pan-Philippine Highway. The ₱1.024-billion bridge was funded partially by the Japan International Cooperation Agency.

The mountainous Agas-Agas section of the Pan-Philippine Highway in Southern Leyte is prone to landslides during heavy rains, much more when a typhoon strikes the province. The bridge was constructed in 2006 to avoid the troublesome section and cut down the driving time for motorists.

Tourism
Seeing its high tourism potential the Department of Public Works and Highways (DPWH) submitted to President Gloria Arroyo the plan to turn the bridge into a haven for enthusiasts of bungee jumping, paramotor, downhill skateboarding, zip-line, rappelling and other extreme sports. On August 9, 2009, the president signed the construction of the bungee jumping platform along the bridge as well as other tourism amenities.

The Agas-Agas Bridge zipline, now known as "Zipline Leyte", opened in April 2011. A Provincial Pavilion complete with a parking lot and food and souvenir kiosks has been constructed atop a promontory overlooking the deep ravine of the nearby gorge. The Agas Agas Bridge also has a spacious parking space, food kiosks and a tourist pavilion.

References 

Bridges in the Philippines
Buildings and structures in Southern Leyte
Beam bridges
Bridges completed in 2009
Japan–Philippines relations